George Clinton Meakim (July 15, 1865 – February 17, 1923), was a Major League Baseball pitcher. He returned to baseball after a three year hiatus, retiring after his age twenty-nine season.

External links

1865 births
1923 deaths
Major League Baseball pitchers
Louisville Colonels players
Philadelphia Athletics (AA 1891) players
Cincinnati Reds players
Chicago Colts players
19th-century baseball players
Scranton Miners players
Hutchinson (minor league baseball) players
Sioux City Corn Huskers players
Rochester Flour Cities players
Troy Trojans (minor league) players
Savannah Electrics players
Savannah Rabbits players
Buffalo Bisons (minor league) players
Troy Washerwomen players
Scranton Indians players
Wilkes-Barre Coal Barons players
New Bedford Whalers (baseball) players
Rochester Browns players
Baseball players from New York (state)